"Bleeding Out" is a song written and recorded by American rock band Imagine Dragons for their debut studio album Night Visions (2012). The song appears as the ninth track on the album. The song peaked at number 30 on the Billboard Rock Songs chart.

Composition

"Bleeding Out" runs at 84 beats per minute. The song, compared to the former half of the Night Visions album, is one of Imagine Dragons' darker songs, and like most of the songs on Night Visions, it makes use of the Bass drum to set the overall tone and mood of the song. The song incorporates a jagged-edge production effect, where the guitar chords are separately recorded and mixed separately from the recording itself. When chords in the song are not repeated and flow through, the recording plays normally. However, if the chords repeat themselves, they literally repeat themselves in the recording as well to produce a broken record effect, as if the recording is skipping over itself. The song also makes use of synthesizer jabs to emphasize the belligerency of the song's atmosphere and mood. Also notable is that the lead-in unusually lasts three beats, unlike most songs where usually the lead-in would last two or a single beat before the song starts.

Live performances
"Bleeding Out" was first played live during the fall of 2012. It was played on 72 shows of the Night Visions Tour in 2013, six times on the Into the Night Tour in 2014, and 18 times during the Smoke + Mirrors Tour in 2015. It has since been played acoustic during the Evolve World Tour.

Charts

Weekly charts

Year-end charts

Certifications

References

2012 songs
Imagine Dragons songs
Songs written by Wayne Sermon
Songs written by Dan Reynolds (musician)
Songs written by Daniel Platzman
Songs written by Ben McKee
Songs written by Alex da Kid
Songs containing the I–V-vi-IV progression